{{DISPLAYTITLE:C10H13N5O5}}
The molecular formula C10H13N5O5 (molar mass: 283.24 g/mol, exact mass: 283.0917 u) may refer to:

 Guanosine
 8-Oxo-2'-deoxyguanosine (8-OxO-dG)